The 2023 FIBA 3x3 World Cup will be held in Vienna, Austria from 30 May to 4 June 2023, and will be contested by 20 teams.

Qualified teams
All five FIBA zones are represented. The top 20 teams, including the hosts, based on the FIBA National Federation ranking qualified for the tournament.

Preliminary round
The pools were announced on 8 March 2023.

Pool A

Pool B

Pool C

Pool D

Knockout stage

Final ranking

References

External links
Official website

Men